Bogorodica may refer to:
 Bogorodica, Gevgelija, a village in North Macedonia
 Madonna (1999 film), a Croatian film
 Theotokos, a title of Mary, mother of Jesus